Ajman Specialty General Hospital is located in Ajman in the United Arab Emirates.  The hospital offers out-patient services and covers a wide range of specialties and it has more than 170 employees.

History
The Ajman Specialty General Hospital was the first hospital in Ajman established in May 2008 by decree of the ruler of Ajman, his highness Sheikh Humaid Bin Rashid Al-Nuaimi.

References

Hospital buildings completed in 2008
Hospitals in the United Arab Emirates
Hospitals established in 2008